The Smith & Wesson Model 386 was a Revolver that could fire .38 Special or .357 Magnum. it was designed to be an Ideal-Carry Revolver

References 

Revolvers of the United States
Smith & Wesson revolvers
.357 Magnum firearms
.38 Special firearms